Glenn Mulvenna (born February 18, 1967) is a Canadian former professional ice hockey centre who played 2 National Hockey League (NHL) games with the Pittsburgh Penguins and Philadelphia Flyers.

Career statistics

External links
 

1967 births
Living people
Canadian ice hockey centres
Flint Spirits players
Fort Wayne Komets players
Hershey Bears players
Kalamazoo Wings (1974–2000) players
Kamloops Blazers players
Knoxville Cherokees players
Ice hockey people from Calgary
Muskegon Lumberjacks players
New Westminster Bruins players
Peoria Rivermen (ECHL) players
Peoria Rivermen (IHL) players
Philadelphia Flyers players
Pittsburgh Penguins players
Sheffield Steelers players
Undrafted National Hockey League players
Canadian expatriate ice hockey players in England